Agustina Padilla (December 10, 2001), better known simply as Agus Padilla, is a Uruguayan singer and songwriter.

Biography 
She was born and raised in the Brazo Oriental neighborhood from Montevideo, the capital of Uruguay. Since she was little she was interested in music.

She started uploading covers at the young age of 12 to the Facebook platform. In 2014 she created her YouTube channel, where she would later start sharing her music there.

Career

Musical beginnings 
In February 2017, she released her first single entitled «Ni tu amiga ni tu amante» ("Neither your friend nor your lover"), along with her video clip, where she gained recognition and popularity. In that year she was chosen to be the opening act for a Daddy Yankee concert in Uruguay.

New era and collaborations 
In January 2018, she participated in the Calibash festival in Las Vegas, one of the most popular in Latin music. There she shared the stage with Ricky Martin, Jennifer López, Maluma, Ozuna and Bad Bunny.

In September she launched her first collaboration with the Argentine Ecko, entitled "Control". Two months later she released her new single "So Well", along with rapper Lit Killah. She was also the opening act for a Bad Bunny concert at the Summer Theater.

At the beginning of 2019, she signed with the record company Warner Music Group. At the same time she released "Papi" with the Argentine singer Papichamp. In November, she recorded in Buenos Aires the video clip for the urban song «Se prendió».

In 2020 she released three singles: the ballad «Por ti» on Valentine's Day, and the reggaeton songs «Me behave badly» ("Me porto mal") and «Oh na na», the first in collaboration with the Uruguayan Pekeño 77.

After a year without uploading music, in July 2021 she returned with "Amor de dos", along with Puerto Rican Darkiel.

Other works 
In 2013, at just 12 years old, she made her television debut as a participant in the Uruguayan version of the program Pequeños Gigantes broadcast by Teledoce.

In 2021, it is part of the second season of the reality show MasterChef Celebrity, broadcast on Canal 10 ("Channel 10").

Filmography

Television

Discography

Singles

As main artist

As a guest artist

References

External links 
 

2001 births
Living people
21st-century Uruguayan women singers
Uruguayan songwriters